Giovanni Angelini was an Italian politician. He was interim Mayor of Rome from March to 16 April 1871.

References

Bibliography
 I sindaci di Roma, Alberto Caracciolo, Donzelli Editore, 1993

19th-century Italian politicians
Mayors of Rome
Year of birth missing
Year of death missing